Switch was a debit card brand in the United Kingdom from 1988 until 2002. It was then merged with Maestro, which is owned by MasterCard.

History
Switch was launched in 1988 by Midland Bank, National Westminster Bank and The Royal Bank of Scotland as a multifunction cheque guarantee and cash card. The brand was merged with Maestro, an international debit card brand owned by Mastercard, at the end of 2002.

This merger was referred to as the "penguin wedding," due to its distinctive advertisements of penguins in different international settings created by Joel Veitch. Since then, Switch has been out of circulation and banks migrated customers from Switch to Maestro. The deal was announced in August 2002.

The merger was also intended to increase the acceptance of foreign Maestro cards in the United Kingdom. However, despite the Maestro brand name, point of sale transactions in the United Kingdom were still processed by Switch Card Services Limited, later S2 Card Services Limited.

Consequently, many retailers who advertise that they accept Maestro could only accept cards issued in the United Kingdom, i.e. former Switch cards that supported both UK Domestic Maestro (UKDM) and Maestro International functionality. In March 2011, Mastercard aligned UK Domestic Maestro with the standard international Maestro proposition, ending its status as a separate card scheme.

This change also led to the discontinuation of Solo debit cards.

Switch/Maestro cards issued by certain banks carried an issue number on the bottom of the card corresponding to the number of times a card had been issued on a particular account. This was usually because the current account number the card was linked to actually formed a large part of the card number, and therefore the card number could not be readily changed in case of loss or the card expiring.

The term "Switch" was commonly used to refer to debit cards in the United Kingdom; however, the brand is largely forgotten now.

In January 2009, First Direct and HSBC discontinued the use of Maestro card, issuing Visa Debit cards to new customers, and a gradual roll out throughout 2009 to existing customers. In September of the same year, Clydesdale Bank and Yorkshire Bank, both owned by National Australia Bank, started the process of replacing the Maestro card with a Debit Mastercard for their current accounts, except for the Readycash and Student accounts, for which the Maestro card continued to be issued.

Likewise, in the same month the then Royal Bank of Scotland Group (Europe's largest debit card issuer which includes the Royal Bank of Scotland, NatWest, Coutts and Ulster Bank) switched from Maestro to Visa Debit, a process that would take two years to complete.

External links

Debit cards
1988 establishments in the United Kingdom
2002 disestablishments in the United Kingdom
NatWest Group